Josser in the Army is a 1932 British war comedy film directed by Norman Lee and starring Ernie Lotinga, Betty Norton, Jack Hobbs. It was part of the Josser series of films featuring Lotinga. It was made at Elstree Studios by British International Pictures.

Synopsis
Following the outbreak of the First World War in 1914, factory foreman Jimmy Josser joins the regiment of his employer. While serving on the western front he manages to thwart a plan by German secret agents.

Cast
 Ernie Lotinga as Jimmy Josser  
 Betty Norton as Joan  
 Jack Hobbs as Paul Langdon  
 Hal Gordon as Parker  
 Jack Frost as Ginger  
 Arnold Bell as Becker  
 Harold Wilkinson as Seeley

References

Bibliography
 Low, Rachael. Filmmaking in 1930s Britain. George Allen & Unwin, 1985.
 Wood, Linda. British Films, 1927-1939. British Film Institute, 1986.

External links

1932 films
British war comedy films
1930s war comedy films
British World War I films
Films shot at British International Pictures Studios
Films directed by Norman Lee
Films set in England
Films set in the 1910s
British black-and-white films
1932 comedy films
1930s English-language films
1930s British films